Martyna Klekot (born 1 July 1988 in Blachownia) is a road cyclist from Poland. She participated at the 2012 UCI Road World Championships. She won the bronze medal at the 2014 World University Cycling Championship in the road race.

References

External links 
 profile at Procyclingstats.com
 Martyna Klekot–Cycling Archives

1988 births
Polish female cyclists
Living people
People from Częstochowa County
Sportspeople from Silesian Voivodeship
21st-century Polish women